Whimoon High School is a private high school in South Korea, located in Daechi-dong, Seoul. It is one of the oldest high schools in South Korea. It is one of the famous and prestigious schools in South Korea. It is well known for the extremely high competition in the school, as well. Its outcome of admission for college is not comparable to any other school in Daechi-dong,Gangnam District.

History 

Whimoon High School traces its beginnings to the opening of Kwangsung-Euisuk in 1901, making it one of the country's oldest high schools still in operation. The founder is Min Young-whi, a nephew of Empress Myeongseong. From the very beginning, Whimoon was intended to be an educational institution to nurture the best and brightest. In 1904, entrance examinations were held to recruit prospective students. Emperor Gojong gave the name school its current the name "Whimoon" in 1906.

In 1914, Whimoon Euisuk became Whimoon Private Normal School and then became Whimoon Middle School in 1928, in line with the changing educational policies of the era. During the Japanese colonial era, the school silently played a role in the Korean independence movement by continuously teaching the Korean language despite it being banned by the colonial government. It first became known for its liberal school culture, an extensive sports program and placing equal emphasis on humanities and liberal arts alongside languages and the sciences. At that time, all schoolboys had to keep a military-style buzz cut and had to abide by a very strict dress code. However, Whimoon did not require its boys to adhere to that mandated hair and dress code. Instead, their students were only expected to maintain a neat appearance and had several types of uniforms to choose from, which was unheard of. The unique school culture would persist into the 1970s.

Initially Whimoon was a six-year school. With the 1957 government policy of "3+3" (3 years of middle school and 3 years of high school), Whimoon was legally split into two separate schools: Whimoon Middle School and Whimoon High School. Both schools still maintain an affiliation, with a large number of alumni from the post-war years having attended both schools.

Originally, the location of the school was middle of Seoul (Jongro-gu). In 1977 and 1979 both schools moved to their current locations in Gangnam, across the Han River. In 2010, it became a self-governing (private) school.

Admissions 
By the law of private school education, Whimoon High School was selected to be a privately-operated high school above numerous other schools. The students who have a higher GPA than other students in their middle school can apply to Whimoon High School.

Sports 
Whimoon High School is an early pioneer in championing the notion of the "student-athlete" in South Korean education. Students were encouraged to join a sports club to complement their academic pursuits. The two sports which the school is best known for – baseball and basketball – were introduced in 1907 and 1927 respectively.

In 2010, Whimoon Baseball team won the President's National High School Baseball Championship for the fifth time. More recently, in 2014, the baseball team won the Bonghwang High School Baseball Tournament, considered to be one of the country's premier high school baseball tournaments.

It was one of the earliest high schools to introduce basketball and has continuously produced players who have gone on to play professionally in the Korean Basketball League and the South Korean national team. During the 1960s to 1980s, it gained a reputation as one of the city's top schools for high school basketball, along with Yongsan and Kyungbock High Schools. Since the 2000s, Whimoon has become better known for baseball and the basketball rivalry has been more centered on Yongsan and Kyungbock.

Alumni 

 Bang Young-ung, novelist
 Cha Jun-hwan, figure skater
 Chung Eui-sun, chairman of Hyundai Motor Group
 Don Spike, musician
 Hyun Joo-yup, retired basketball player
 Jeong Ji-yong, poet
 Kim Dong-ryul, singer-songwriter
 Kim Dong-wan, singer and actor, member of Shinhwa
 Kim Han-jung, National Congressman
 Kim Hoon, a novelist.
 Kim Jong-hak, film director and producer
 Gim Yujeong, a novelist
 Kim Jun-myeon (Suho), singer and actor, member of EXO
 Kim Min-gyu, baseball player
 Kim Seok-woo (Rowoon), singer and actor, member of SF9
 Kim You-jeong, novelist
 Jang Hang-jun, film director.
 Lee Dong-gun, actor 
 Lee Jung-hoo, baseball player
 Lee Seung-hwan, singer
 Moong Gyu-Young, Chairman of Aju Group
 Park Min-woo, baseball player
 Seo Jang-hoon, television personality and retired basketball player
 Sohn Suk-hee, news anchor and journalist
 Shin Dong-pa, retired basketball player and coach
 Shin Sung-rok, television and musical theater actor
 Yoo Ji-tae, actor

References

External links 
School Website 

High schools in Seoul
Gangnam District
Educational institutions established in 1906
Private schools in South Korea
1906 establishments in Korea
Boys' schools in South Korea